Darkflank pipefish (Syngnathus taenionotus) is a pipefish species that inhabits the north-western Adriatic. It is found both in marine and brackish habitats. It is a demersal fish in which the males are ovoviviparous. It is found mostly among detritus or vegetation on the shallow muddy bottom.

References

Fish of the Adriatic Sea
Fish of Europe
Syngnathus
Fish described in 1871